Mary Anne Swainson (1833–1897) was a notable New Zealand headmistress of Fitzherbert Terrace School. She was born in Brough, Westmorland, England in about 1833.

References

1833 births
1897 deaths
New Zealand schoolteachers
English emigrants to New Zealand
19th-century New Zealand people